Lurgan is a town in County Armagh, Northern Ireland.

Lurgan may also refer to:

Places
Republic of Ireland
Lurgan, County Cavan, a civil parish in County Cavan
Lurgan, Kilkenny West, a townland in Kilkenny West civil parish, barony of Kilkenny West, County Westmeath
Lurgan, Killare, a townland in Killare civil parish, barony of Rathconrath, County Westmeath
Lurgan, Kilmanaghan, a townland in Kilmanaghan civil parish, barony of Kilcoursey, County Offaly

Note: Lurgan also applies to 14 other townlands in Northern Ireland and the Republic of Ireland

See also
Lurgan Branch
Lurgan Celtic F.C.
Lurgan College
Lurgan Cricket Club
Lurgan Mail
Lurgan Subdivision
Lurgan Town F.C.
Lurganare
Lurganure
Lurganville